The Czech Constitutionalist Progressive Party was a Czech political party in Austria-Hungary. The party was established in April 1909 by a merger of the Czech Radical Progressive Party and the Czech Constitutionalist Radical Party. The first leader of the party was Antonín Hajn, former leader of the Radical Progressives. The party spokesman was Lev Borský.

Program 
The party was a radical upholder of the rights of the Lands of the Bohemian Crown and supporter of democratization and economic reforms. The party ideology was liberalism, drawing inspiration from the ideas of the American Revolution and the liberal democracy the party saw in the United States. In May 1914, the party published a "Manifesto to Europe" where it proclaimed support to the Triple Entente. During World War I, the party was suspended. Many party members joined the Czech resistance in the Maffia organization.

In February 1918 the party merged into the Czech Constitutional Democracy which was later succeeded by the Czechoslovak National Democracy.

Electoral results

References

Political parties in Austria-Hungary
Political parties established in 1908
Political parties disestablished in 1918
1908 establishments in Austria-Hungary
1918 disestablishments in Austria-Hungary
Defunct political parties in the Czech Republic
Radical parties